Hill Benson  (1705-1775) was an Irish Anglican priest in the eighteenth century.

Benson was born in Dublin and educated at Trinity College, Dublin. He was Dean of Connor from 1753 until his death.

References

Alumni of Trinity College Dublin
Deans of Connor
18th-century Irish Anglican priests
Christian clergy from Dublin (city)
1775 deaths
1705 births